Det Syntetiske Parti (English: The Synthetic Party) is a political party in Denmark. The party was founded in 2022 by the artist group Computer Lars and the tech-hub MindFuture ApS. The Synthetic Party is generally considered to be the world's first political party driven by artificial intelligence. It is led by a chatbot named Leader Lars.

The founder and continuous party secretary is Asker Bryld Staunæs, a conceptual artist and philosopher from Aarhus University.

References 

Political parties in Denmark